Scedella is a genus of tephritid  or fruit flies in the family Tephritidae.

Species
Scedella basilewskyi (Munro, 1956)
Scedella boxiana Munro, 1957
Scedella caesia Munro, 1957
Scedella caffra (Loew, 1861)
Scedella cyana (Walker, 1849)
Scedella dissoluta (Loew, 1861)
Scedella flecta Munro, 1957
Scedella formosella (Hendel, 1915)
Scedella glebosa Munro, 1957
Scedella incurva Munro, 1957
Scedella infrequens (Hardy & Drew, 1996)
Scedella kawandana Munro, 1957
Scedella longiseta (Hering, 1941)
Scedella orientalis (Meijere, 1908)
Scedella pilosa Munro, 1957
Scedella praetexta (Loew, 1861)
Scedella sandoana Munro, 1957
Scedella spatulata Munro, 1957
Scedella spiloptera (Bezzi, 1913)

References

Tephritinae
Tephritidae genera
Diptera of Africa
Diptera of Asia
Diptera of Australasia